WYRO (98.7 FM) is a radio station broadcasting a classic rock format. Licensed to McArthur, Ohio, United States, the station is currently owned by Alan Stockmeister, through licensee Jackson County Broadcasting, Inc. It features programming from Compass Media Networks.

History
The station went on the air as WJTD on 1994-03-25. On 1997-06-30, the station changed its call sign to WCLX, on 1998-01-23 to WYPC-FM, on 1998-07-10 to WCLX, on 1998-12-14 to WJLI, and on 1999-09-24 to the current WYRO.

References

External links

WYRO 98.7 Classic Rock on Facebook

YRO
Classic rock radio stations in the United States